The George Chaffey Bridge is a road bridge in Australia that carries the Sturt Highway across the Murray River from Buronga to Mildura.

History

Old Mildura Bridge
The previous Mildura Bridge was opened on 22 October 1927. The design allowed for it to carry both road and railway traffic, but railway tracks were never laid. It was a lift-span bridge supported by concrete pylons, with two approach spans on each side. Two of the truss spans and the lift span are now in the Mildura Marina.

Current bridge
Named in honour of engineer George Chaffey, the current bridge opened on 12 March 1985, by the Federal Minister of Transport the Hon. Peter Morris, the Minister for Roads (New South Wales) the Hon. Laurie Brereton, and the Minister of Transport (Victoria) the Hon. Steve Crabb. The project was funded under the Australian Bicentennial Road Development Programme, constructed at an estimated cost of $14 million.

See also

List of bridges in Australia
List of crossings of the Murray River

References

External links

Borders of New South Wales
Borders of Victoria (Australia)
Bridges in the Riverina
Bridges completed in 1985
Concrete bridges in Australia
Crossings of the Murray River
Mildura
Road bridges in New South Wales
Road bridges in Victoria (Australia)
Wentworth Shire
1985 establishments in Australia